Televisión Boliviana (Bolivia TV) is the first television channel of Bolivia and serves the only means of television communication from the government. The channel was established in August 1969 under the government of Luis Adolfo Siles after years of planning by the government of then-recently deceased René Barrientos. It is a state-owned broadcasting network.

TV Boliviana was the only nationwide TV channel until Paceña de Televisión was established on October 24, 1984.

History

Military governments (1969-1979)

State television in Bolivia emerged a long time after that in other Latin American countries. Televisión Boliviana was founded on August 30, 1969, during the constitutional government of President Luis Adolfo Siles Salinas, being an unfinished project of the last stage of the deceased president René Barrientos Ortuño Of a state nature, two years later it became the tool with which the dictatorship of Hugo Bánzer tried to neutralize the influence of the mining stations, and to prevent them from operating successfully. In 1974, the government and COMIBOL distributed five thousand television sets in the mines with extensive payment facilities. According to testimonies from the families of the miners, the introduction of this new medium changed the views and expectations of the population, although later in 1978 the miners demanded the return and reopening of their radios through a stoppage of activities.

In 1979, the structure of the television market in the country was made up of nine television stations: eight managed by state universities with regional coverage, and one state network with national coverage. That same year General David Padilla authorized the granting of licenses for private television stations. However, before they were assigned, his regime suffered a coup by General García Meza, who promptly re-established the state monopoly on television, and appointed military rectors in the universities, so that its channels came under the close control of the Ministry of the Interior. The relative independence that these stations had until then was considerably reduced.

Color Television (1979)
On August 1, 1979, Televisión Boliviana began broadcasting on the NTSC system. in color compatible with the M transmission system in black and white . This, despite the fact that from 1976 some foreign productions could be seen in color in the country.

Democratic governments and the exit of private media (1982-2003)

During the governments of presidents Hernán Siles Zuazo (1982-1985) and Víctor Paz Estenssoro (1985-1989), Televisión Boliviana showed greater political plurality, including spaces for the opposition and more objective journalism . The administration of President Jaime Paz Zamora (1989-1993) continued with this opening. But by then, the private media began broadcasting clandestinely, and even managed to obtain broadcasting licenses, events that caused a drop in audience for the state network. During the first government of President Gonzalo Sánchez de Lozada (1993-1997), the channel's newscasts were directed by the journalist Carlos Mesa. The station's programming broadcast a wide variety of journalistic, historical and documentary programs. Some spaces were broadcast in indigenous languages.

With the arrival of the second government of president Hugo Bánzer (1997-2001), the editorial line of Televisión Boliviana took a clear turn to the right. Military parades and national commemorations were often broadcast. News programs avoided mentioning the bloody human rights violations that occurred in the 1970s, during the first Bánzer government. After his death in 2002, his successor, Jorge Quiroga (2001-2002), the network did not make significant changes.

During the second government of President Gonzalo Sánchez de Lozada (which began in August 2002) an attempt was made to return to a program similar to that of his first term from 1993 to 1997, but the resounding fall of his government with the Gas War in October 2003 left many projects shelved. In the political turmoil that shook the country in the two years and two months that followed, the station was unable to adopt a defined information line and its programming showed a gradual deterioration that did not improve until the decline of its corporate identity.

Decline and closure of Televisión Boliviana (2005-2009)

Since the assumption of the presidency by the first government of Evo Morales Ayma, in January 2006, the channel has undergone profound changes. One of his projects was the beginning of broadcasts in high definition for the first time in the country.

Since 2007, the network has entered into an alliance with the Japanese television station NHK for the broadcast of documentaries. However, due to the costs of maintaining the alliance due to the low budget suffered by the channel, they were removed from the air. Even some Telesur productions that were broadcast on TVB were taken off the air. The eliminated programming was replaced by the transmission of Bolivian films and events related to works by the Evo Morales government. The network tried to increase the audience and the commercial collection with the incorporation of programs such as La Justa or continue with the broadcast of programs such as Bolivia Agropecuaria and Viajero. Even so, the station caused a huge debt to the Bolivian State, which chose to declare it bankrupt. This fact caused the cessation of operations of the Bolivian National Television Company.

On April 15, 2009, through Supreme Decree No. 0074, the "Liquidation of the Empresa Nacional de Televisión Boliviana - ENTB" was declared, and in turn the closure of operations and transfer of equipment and assets of ENTB to the State Company. to be created, ending the first television network in the history of Bolivia, 4 months after the 40th anniversary of the start of operations of the state channel.

Beginning of Bolivia TV (2009)

Supreme Decree No. 0078  determines the creation of the State Television Company called “Bolivia TV”; determine its legal nature, object, heritage; and establish the composition and attributions of its board of directors and its general manager, with legal domicile in the city of La Paz. The general manager will be appointed by the minister of the presidency through a ministerial resolution.

The board of "Bolvia TV" is made up of the ministers of:
 Presidency
 Development Planning
 Economy and Public Finance
 Public Works, Services and Housing
 Education
 Cultures

On February 15, 2011, Supreme Decree No. 0793 was enacted, which establishes the creation of the Ministry of Communication and, in turn, the responsibility of appointing the General Manager of Bolivia TV.

After the bankruptcy, a new company called Bolivia TV1 was created, which continues broadcasting on the frequencies previously used by TVB, few programs of the defunct station continued to be broadcast by the recently inaugurated chain. In addition, the channel began broadcasting 24 hours a day.

Launch on DTT and HD signal (2011)

Since the end of September 2011, BTV began broadcasting on digital terrestrial television on channel 16 UHF in La Paz, from the La Ceja studios in El Alto. A month later, in October of the same year, from its experimentation in the Folkloric Entrance of the Oruro Carnival, Bolivia TV launched its own signal in HD. The channel became the first station in Bolivia to broadcast in high definition.

By 2021, it has two high-definition signals.

Bolivia TV 7.1

It is the main signal of the station. It broadcasts in high definition with the same programming that it broadcasts at the Avenida Camacho Studios, La Paz. It does not broadcast regional programming, which is broadcast exclusively by VHF in analog form in the different departments of the country.

Bolivia TV 7.2

It is the second channel signal. Its programming consists mainly of sporting events, and in the background of national and foreign productions broadcast by the main signal, with the exception of newscasts.

Like Televisión Boliviana 
Before becoming Bolivia TV, Televisión Boliviana had the mission of educating, informing and entertaining and each general manager decided how many hours and which programs were aired. Starting with the color era, in 1980 TVB broadcast from 5:00 p.m. and its early afternoon shows consisted of mostly American cartoons. Afterwards, youth programs of North American pop music, a sports program, the general news program "Telenoticioso Boliviano", a Mexican or Brazilian soap opera and American TV series such as Starsky and Hutch were broadcast to culminate broadcasts.

On Saturdays and Sundays, the television network extended its hours until 3:00 p.m. on Saturdays and 11:00 a.m. on Sundays. Among its outstanding programs were the classic films from the United States dubbed into Spanish, cartoons, American TV series and the program Deporte Total, which completed the programming. On Sunday mornings, TV Boliviana broadcast the Catholic Mass from the Basilica of San Francisco.

With the arrival of private stations, TVB's programming first reached 15 hours a day of broadcast starting at 9:00 a.m. It started the day with a talk show until 12:00 p.m., then a sports program followed, hence cartoons, films and youth programs in the afternoons. The newscast was also broadcast at night, followed by a soap opera, and to finish, a movie from the great collection of dubbed classics that the channel had in its archive was broadcast.

After 1987, the station was known as "the channel of the Holy Spirit" since, due to its low power and constant interference from other media, the signal could not be fully received. At that stage, TVB was putting aside commercial programming to focus on cultural, educational and news programs.

In 1993, Canal 7 was the first media outlet in Bolivia to start its satellite broadcasts, but its terrestrial signal at that time left much to be desired. Having released a new 10 kW transmitter and new equipment donated by the Government of Spain, in a short time they began to show defects, needed spare parts and stopped working. The TVB signal was barely visible.

It was in each special event like the 1994 USA World Cup when TVB showed its power and coverage, reaching with its repeaters to places that were not covered by private stations.

The World Cup in France in 1998 was the last one broadcast by TV Boliviana, which was made with joint broadcasts together with ATB.

From 2000 to 2007, the station broadcast NHK World programming.

Like Bolivia TV

With the relaunch of the channel as Bolivia TV, the strategy of the current government was continued, although now in "schedules published on the Internet". As of 2012, the network takes up the cultural agenda with transmissions of folk festivals that took place throughout the country apart from the "Carnaval de Oruro", such as the "Integration Entrance" from Buenos Aires, Argentina. Likewise, live broadcasts of concerts by Bolivian groups were developed, whether folklore, theater or a music festival such as the "Festival de la canción boliviana" better known as "Aquí, canta Bolivia", also the Festival de Música Barroca from Chiquitos and Sucre, the concerts of Los Kjarkas around the world.

As a way of broadcasting sporting events, as of 2011, Bolivia TV broadcasts national tennis, basketball and tennis tournaments, in addition to the Juegos Estudiantiles Plurinacionales organized by the Central Government. Since 2011, "La Carrera de Automovilismo, Presidente Evo Morales" and "La Carrera Pedestre" have been broadcast, also organized by the Government. As for football, the state-owned company signed the broadcasting rights contract for the games of the "Liga del Fútbol Profesional Boliviano", both Nacional A and Nacional B. (including the Bolivian Cup final) and the World Cup Qualifying matches in both 2010 and 2014. It also broadcasts boxing tournaments, especially those in which the compatriot and world title winner Jennifer Salinas participates.

From 2012 to the beginning of 2013, Bolivia TV broadcast Disney and Nickelodeon children's productions but it was not successful, especially in the city of El Alto due to the claims of social organizations. Faced with this situation, the children's block was eliminated from the programming of the string.

In mid-2013, show business was added to the program, in addition to international fashion events such as The Fashion Parade at the Salar de Uyuni.

In 2014, BTV's programming was expanded with the transmission of the Baroque Music Concert in Concepción, followed by the concert by Los Kjarkas, the final of the Nacional B, the last friendlies of the Bolivian team against Spain and Greece, and the transmission of the World Cup 2014.

From 2015 to 2018, Bolivia TV broadcast the UEFA Champions League.

Programming
 El Noticiero Informa (today Documentaries of TV Culturas)
 Defensa del Consumidor
 Pedimos la Palabra, a program carried out by young people.
 Comunidad Sexual
 Parada Médica
 Vivir Bien, broadcast on health care.
 Espejos
 Análisis Arbitral.
 TV Congreso, broadcast live from the Plurinational Legislative Assembly.
 Jardín de Sol y Luna, a children's program about an upper-class family in La Paz.
 Brújula, a tourist program that shows festivities and customs from different parts of Bolivia.
 Chaco y Punto, a cultural program about the Chaco and northern Argentina.
 Axesso, national and international rock music program, but transferred to RTP.
 Showcase, musical program, directed by Joaquín Carvajal, presenter Anthony Sandoval.
 Children's programs drawn from the companies Hasbro, Disney, Nickelodeon and Discovery Kids. Citing as an example Backjardygans and Rolie Polie Olie. Airing in 2012.
 La Cabina Azul, current affairs program with an informative nature on science, technology, innovation, pop culture, geek interests and specialized entertainment.
 Bolivia con Altura, documentary program of Bolivian folklore artists.

Programs broadcast on Canal 7.2 
 Magnolia, a program of reports for artists from various art fields.
 Kinema, reflecting the history of Bolivian cinema.
 Muyuspa, children's education program.

Programs broadcast until November 11, 2019 
 Amazonia a Day
 Estudio 7, a very interesting amenities program
 Markasana Arupa, bilingual news program (in Spanish and indigenous languages).
 Revolución Cultural, cultural program.
 Vivir Bien, broadcast on health care.
 Gestión de Gobierno.
 El pueblo es noticia, in association with Radio Illimani.
 CD7 Canal de Deportes, produced by the sports journalist Gonzalo Cobo (Futbolmania Bolivia). Who also organized programs such as 5-7 Deportes and CD7 Regional.
 Con Sello Boliviano'.
 Área Restringida, an entertainment program for teenagers on youth issues.
 Kuma Jakaru, "From the entrails of the soul": Program that shows the folklore and culture of Bolivia, both nationally and internationally.
 TIEMPOS DE CAMBIO, a program that brings about the projects proposed by the president Evo Morales and even the events in the country. Program carried out by social movements related to the government and supporters of the Movimiento al Socialismo (Bolivia)
REWIND: Pop music program from the 70's, 80's and 90's, hosted by Vladimir Bravo who also participated in the network Unitel in the Endemol program, Yo me llamo.
Entre Culturas: Also called "Bolivia Constituent: process of change", organized by indigenous social and cultural movements that supported the MAS-IPSP. Issued as of 2007, in the midst of the Bolivian Constituent Assembly of 2006.
Russia Times Documentaries
Hashtag: Entertainment and interaction youth program.

Programs broadcast until December 31, 2019 
SIN SECRETOS CON LIBERTAD: Pastry program, hosted by Libertad Aparicio and sponsored by ARPO BOLIVIA LTDA (distributor of Wilton products).

Programming until December 7, 2020 
BTV News: Divided into:
Somos Bolivia: Morning magazine of General events.
Noticiero regional: Exclusive broadcast for a certain department and/or region. It broadcasts at 11:00, 15:00 and 17:00 with a duration of 1 hour.
Segunda Edición. Reprisa at 9:00 p.m. and lasts 1 hour and 30 minutes.
Tercera Edición: Reprise at 22:30 and lasts 1 hour and a half.
Edición Medianoche. It lasts 30 minutes.
Quechua/Aymara.
Reporte BTV
Muyuspa, Program where children are educated to be good citizens, reflected by its protagonists, also children.
Listos a jugar: Latin American spin-off of Sésamo, seeks to promote correct eating, physical activity, hygiene, nutrition and preschool emotional well-being. The regional project is in partnership with the FEMSA Foundation, the Ministry of Health in Mexico, Canal Once, UNICEF, the Carlos Slim Foundation, and Ecuador TV, which promotes healthy habits.
Héroes, Documentary series interviewing notable Bolivian athletes.
Ciudad Museo, a cultural space that presents the museums and heritage sites that abound in the capital of Bolivia, Sucre.
Bolivia Extrema, showing extreme sports from the most visited places in the country.
BTV en concierto, a space dedicated to the music of Bolivian artists, such as folklore. Sometimes it is broadcast live.
Diseño y Construcción.
Hablemos: Talk show with themes towards a specific focus per chapter.
Bolivia Agropecuaria
The Legend of Bruce Lee
Curiosamente: Animated Mini-Documentaries in collaboration with Estudio Haini in the form of drawings mixed with scientific and encyclopedic facts.
Imaginary: It shows different types of cultures, both original and urban, from another point of view.
El Chef sin Fronteras: Program with the style of cooking outside the studios, usually outdoors
Magnolia
Como Hans por su casa: Tourist Program.
Colores del Fútbol: Program in collaboration with the OAS.
Acordes Bolivianos
Hashtag 2.0
3600: Santa Misa
Santa Misa (From the Episcopal Church: Also broadcast by PAT and Red Uno.)
Resumen Deportivo
Full Pesca Tv Aventura: Before it was broadcast on Cadena A
Lo mejor de José Mota, Spanish humorous program.
Legend of Entrepreneurship: A series produced by China's state broadcaster CCTV, in association with Classic Media Films.

References

Trivia
"Showcase" was a musical TV programme aired on Bolivia TV in 2010 with presenter Anthony Sandoval, later to become the established musician SEN.

External links
 Official site 
 Information on Bolivia Press, Media, TV, Radio and Newspapers from Press Reference

Mass media in Bolivia
Television in Bolivia
Publicly funded broadcasters
Television channels and stations established in 1969
Spanish-language television stations
Mass media in La Paz
State media